Aylar Dianati Lie (born 12 February 1984) is an Iranian-Norwegian actress, model, singer and former pornographic actress. She has worked as a music video actress and singer, appearing in several of Swedish DJ Basshunter's music videos. She became famous after participating in the Norwegian Big Brother.

Early life 
Aylar Dianati Lie was born on 1984 in Tehran. Her father is an Iranian Azerbaijani. She moved to Norway when she was 3 years old. After arriving in Norway, her parents separated and Aylar was placed in the custody of the Child Protective Services. After a few years she was taken into the foster care system. Aylar had moved eighteen times before she began elementary school, and until finally she found foster parents. Her biological mother moved to the United States, while her father remained in constant struggle with the Norwegian authorities.

She is fluent in Norwegian, Persian and English. As a child she was fluent in Azerbaijani Turkish.

Career

Actress and model 
Lie started out as a pornographic actress. She starred in 10 porn films between 2002 and 2003, but then decided to end her porn-industry career and switch to mainstream modeling. She competed in the Miss Norway pageant in 2004, but was disqualified from the contest when it was found she had starred in adult films; candidates to the pageant must not have been pictured naked in any commercial production or publication. Her adult film career has made her the target of much criticism and prevented her from visiting her father in Iran.

In a July 2010 interview, Lie stated that she "sorely regrets" having engaged in pornographic acting. She explained that the choice was made while she was going through a difficult time of her life, and she wished she could "erase that from [her] past". She also denied that she was banned from entering her native Iran because of her pornographic background.

Her plans for 2006 included the promotion of her hand-picked team of models, called Team Aylar. The members of Team Aylar originally included Elita Löfblad, Charlotte Fredriksen, Linn Irene (Linni) Meister, Cathrine Aschim, and Lisa Marie Winther.

Appearances 
In 2010, Lie participated in the 6th season of Skal vi danse?, the Norwegian version of the British series Strictly Come Dancing. When Danish media ran a headline focusing on her past as a porn actress she expressed sadness and strong distress and that she was tired of being linked to events ten years in her past, although she acknowledged she may have to live with this part of her life being repeatedly brought to the surface. She pointed out that what took place in Los Angeles happened during a period of crisis in her personal life and that she has repeatedly attempted to clean the slate with regard to this.

She was signed to Hard2Beat, after which she released the single "Some People", which features Ocean Drive and DJ Oriska.

Filmography

Feature films
 2009: Dådyr
 2010: Yohan: The Child Wanderer

Music videos
 2006: Sunblock – "First Time"
 2007: Basshunter – "Now You're Gone"
 2007: Yousef feat. Aylar – "Mamacita"
 2008: Basshunter – "All I Ever Wanted"
 2008: Basshunter – "Angel in the Night"
 2008: Basshunter – "I Miss You"
 2009: Basshunter – "Every Morning"
 2009: Basshunter – "I Promised Myself"
 2009: Basshunter – "Jingle Bells"
 2010: Arash feat. Timbuktu, Aylar & Yag – "Dasa Bala"
 2010: Aylar Lie feat. Ocean Drive – "Some People"
 2012: Basshunter – "Northern Light"
 2012: Arash feat. Sean Paul – "She Makes Me Go"

Television 
(all Norwegian television appearances except where indicated)
 2005: Først & sist (guest)
 2005: Big Brother Norge Sverige (guest appearance / joint Norwegian/Swedish program)
 2005: Aylar – Ett år i rampelyset (meaning Aylar – A Year in the Spotlight) (as herself)
 2007: Rikets røst
 2009: Helt ærlig (guest)
 2009: 4-stjerners middag halv åtte (participant)
 2010: Sommertid (guest)
 2010: Skal vi danse (Dancing with a star) with Åsleik Engmark (finished runners-up)

Discography

Singles

As lead artist

As featured artist

Other songs

As featured artist

References

External links
 

1984 births
Living people
Norwegian people of Iranian descent
Iranian people of Azerbaijani descent
21st-century Norwegian women singers
21st-century Norwegian singers
Norwegian pop singers
Norwegian female models
Norwegian pornographic film actresses
Iranian emigrants to Norway
Beauty pageant controversies
Dance Nations artists